Agathis lanceolata is a species of conifer in the family Araucariaceae.
It is found only in New Caledonia.
It is threatened by habitat loss.

References

External links
The Gymnosperm Database

lanceolata
Conservation dependent plants
Endemic flora of New Caledonia
Taxonomy articles created by Polbot